Tehching (Sam) Hsieh (謝德慶; born 31 December 1950; Nan-Chou, Pingtung County, Taiwan) is a US performance artist of Taiwanese background. He has been called a "master" by fellow performance artist Marina Abramović.

Early life
Hsieh was one of 15 children from a family in southern Taiwan. He dropped out from high school and started creating paintings; he went on to create several performance pieces after finishing his three years of compulsory military service in Taiwan. In 1974, he jumped ship onto a pier on the Delaware River, near Philadelphia, and made his way to New York City, working as a dishwasher and cleaner during his first four years there.

Career
From 1978 to 1986, Hsieh accomplished five One Year Performances; from 1986 to 1999, he worked on what he called his "Thirteen-Year Plan". On 1 January 2000, in his report to the public, he announced that he had "kept himself alive". He has stopped making art since then.

In 2008, MIT Press published Out of Now, The Lifeworks of Tehching Hsieh by Adrian Heathfield and Hsieh - a monograph with documentation, essays by academics and artists and an extended conversation. The year after its release, he told the New York Times, "Because of this book I can die tomorrow."

The next year, the Museum of Modern Art (MoMA) in New York exhibited a collection documenting his work. The exhibition, titled "Performance 1: Tehching Hsieh" and organized by Klaus Biesenbach, was the inaugural installation in a series of original performance pieces at the museum. Positively reviewed by the New York Times, the show led to a larger recognition of Hsieh's work. The Solomon R. Guggenheim Museum in New York also showed one of his works the same year as part of its retrospective exhibition, "The Third Mind: American Artists Contemplate Asia: 1860-1989."

Curated by Adrian Heathfield, Taiwan's Pavilion at the 57th Venice Biennale in 2017 featured Hsieh's work in an exhibition titled "Doing Time".

Early works

Jump Piece 

In 1973, Hsieh documented himself jumping out of a second-story window in Taiwan, and breaking both of his ankles on the concrete.

Durational works 
He is most known for six durational performance pieces completed between 1978 and 2000.

One Year Performance 1978–1979 (Cage Piece)
In this performance, which lasted from 29 September 1978 through 30 September 1979, the artist locked himself in an  wooden cage, furnished only with a wash basin, lights, a pail, and a single bed. During the year, he did not allow himself to talk, to read, to write, or to listen to radio and TV. A lawyer, Robert Projansky, notarized the entire process and made sure the artist never left the cage during that one year. His loftmate Cheng Wei Kuong came daily to deliver food, remove the artist's waste, and take a single photograph to document the project. In addition, this performance was open to be viewed once or twice a month from 11am to 5pm.

One Year Performance 1980–1981 (Time Clock Piece)
For one year, from 11 April 1980 through 11 April 1981, Hsieh punched a time clock every hour on the hour. Each time he punched the clock, he took a single picture of himself, which together yield a 6-minute movie. He shaved his head before the piece, so his growing hair reflects the passage of time.

Documentation of this piece was exhibited at the Solomon R. Guggenheim Museum in 2009, using film, punch cards and photographs.

This work was the first of Hsieh's ever to be displayed in the UK at the Liverpool Biennial in 2010.

During the summer of 2017, this piece was displayed at the Tate Modern Art gallery in London.

In his 2013 list of the greatest performance art works, Dale Eisinger of Complex wrote that One Year Performance 1980–1981 (Time Clock Piece) "is thought to have bridged a gap between industry and art in a way particular to the individual that Warhol's grand factory pieces couldn't achieve."

One Year Performance 1981–1982 (Outdoor Piece)
In his third one-year performance piece, from 26 September 1981 through 26 September 1982, Hsieh spent one year outside, not entering buildings or shelter of any sort, including cars, trains, airplanes, boats, or tents. He moved around New York City with a packbag and a sleeping bag.

Art / Life: One Year Performance 1983-1984 (Rope Piece)
In this performance, Hsieh and Linda Montano spent one year between 4 July 1983 and 4 July 1984 tied to each other with an  rope. They had to stay in the same room when inside, but were not allowed to touch each other until the end of the one-year period. Both shaved their hair in the beginning of the year, and the performance was notarized initially by Paul Grassfield and later by Pauline Oliveros.

One Year Performance 1985–1986 (No Art Piece)
For one year, Hsieh unaffiliated himself with art in any way possible: he did not create any art, didn't talk about art, didn't look at anything related to art, didn't read any books about art, and did not enter any art museum or gallery.

Tehching Hsieh 1986–1999 (Thirteen Year Plan)
At the beginning of this epic piece, Hsieh declared, "Will make Art during this time. Will not show it publicly."
This plan began on his 36th birthday, 31 December 1986, and lasted until his 49th birthday, 31 December 1999.

At the end, on 1 January 2000 he issued his concluding report, "I kept myself alive. I passed the December 31st, 1999." The report consisted of cutout letters pasted onto a single sheet of paper.

Philosophy 
His pieces are not feats of stamina nor consciously motivated by a desire to suffer (although they have been described as ordeals), but rather are explorations of time and of struggle. According to the American cultural critic Steven Shaviro, Hsieh's work can be seen as being about imprisonment, solitude, work, time, homelessness, exposure, marriage / human relations, and the way in which art and life are related. The artist himself states his work is about "wasting time and freethinking".

A little after 1999, he declared he was no longer an artist. He has, however, continued to give interviews to an art audience. He has expressed that he likes the work of Praxis (Delia Bajo and Brainard Carey).

Influences on contemporary artists
In 2001, André Éric Létourneau embarked on a 16-year-long art project during which he meets 198 different persons unknown to him and spends a day with each of them, searching for a place to keep a three-minute silence for one of the countries in the world.
In 2014, Benjamin Bennett embarked on a series of live actions broadcast by streaming on the Web named Sitting and Smiling. For each section he stares motionless in front of the camera for a period of four hours, twice a week without pause since the project started. He told Vice magazine that he was inspired by Hsieh's work.

Personal life
Hsieh currently lives in Clinton Hill, Brooklyn. Ai Weiwei is a former landlord and an old friend.

See also
Taiwanese art

References

External links 
Tehching Hsieh official website
Video interview in the Art Newspaper with Jean Wainwright, 7 April 2009
Interview with Robert Ayers, April 2009
"Body of Art" audio slideshow on BBC Radio 4
Official website - The Taiwan Pavilion "Doing Time" at the 57th Venice Biennial
Taipei Fine Arts Museum official website - The Taiwan Pavilion "Doing Time" at the 57th Venice Biennial
Asia Art Center

 

1950 births
Living people
American performance artists
Taiwanese painters
Painters from New York City
People from Pingtung County
Taiwanese emigrants to the United States
20th-century American painters
Taiwanese performance artists
People from Clinton Hill, Brooklyn
21st-century American painters